Claudine Beckford (10 October 1988) is a Jamaican-born American woman cricketer. She made her international debut at the 2011 Women's Cricket World Cup Qualifier representing United States. Claudine also played domestic cricket matches for Jamaica before moving to United States. In March 2019, she was named in the United States team for the 2019 ICC Women's Qualifier Americas tournament against Canada. She made her WT20I debut for the United States against Canada in the Americas Qualifier on 17 May 2019.

In August 2019, she was named in the American squad for the 2019 ICC Women's World Twenty20 Qualifier tournament in Scotland. She played in the United States' opening match of the tournament, on 31 August 2019, against Scotland.

In February 2021, she was named in the Women's National Training Group by the USA Cricket Women's National Selectors ahead of the 2021 Women's Cricket World Cup Qualifier and the 2021 ICC Women's T20 World Cup Americas Qualifier tournaments.

References

External links 
 

1988 births
Living people
Jamaican women cricketers
American women cricketers
United States women Twenty20 International cricketers
American people of Jamaican descent
Jamaican emigrants to the United States
People from Saint Thomas Parish, Jamaica
21st-century American women